Ulf Moen (born 6 April 1958) is a Norwegian footballer. He played in four matches for the Norway national football team from 1984 to 1985.

References

External links
 

1958 births
Living people
Norwegian footballers
Norway international footballers
Place of birth missing (living people)
Association footballers not categorized by position